Joni was Right I / II is the fifth studio album from Norwegian singer-songwriter Marit Larsen, and is the first material to be released on Larsen's own independent label Håndbryggrecords.

The album was initially released as two EPs. The first, Joni was Right, was released digitally on April 1, 2016 and the second, Joni was Right II, was released digitally on September 9, 2016. Both Part I and II were then released as a full-length album on CD and vinyl on September 9, 2016, under the title, Joni was Right I / II, with the album entering the Norwegian album charts at No.36 on 16 September 2016. In 2017 Larsen was awarded the Edvard Prize in the category Popular music for the album.

Track listing

Technical credits  

 Marit Larsen – Vocals, Producer, Arranger, Piano, Acoustic Guitar
 Tor Egil Kreken – Bass, Banjo, Percussion
 Mari Sandvær Kreken – Backing Vocals, Dulcimer, Acoustic Guitar, Percussion
 Christer Slaaen – Acoustic Guitar, Electric Guitar, Mandolin, Piano
 Kristoffer Lo – Brass (Track 6, 8, 9, 10)
 Isa Caroline Holmesland – Violin, Viola (Track 2)
 Kaja Fjellberg Pettersen – Cello (Track 2)
 Andreas Eide Larsen – Recording Engineer
 Bjarne Stensli – Mixing
 George Tanderø – Mastering
 Ingrid Pop – Photography
 Overhaus – Design

Charts

Release history

References 

2016 albums
Marit Larsen albums